Trodely Island (variant: Trodley Island) is an uninhabited Canadian arctic island located in the southeastern part of James Bay in the territory of Nunavut.

References 

Islands of James Bay
Uninhabited islands of Qikiqtaaluk Region